Wind Games are an annual tournament for indoor skydiving, sponsored by Windoor, a manufacturer of vertical wind tunnels. The event first took place in 2014 and  has always been held at Windoor's facility in Empuriabrava, Spain.

Wind Games includes solo, two-person, 4-person, dynamic, freestyle and speed events, all in a vertical wind tunnel.

Wind Games 2014 was held on January 17–18.

Wind Games 2015 was held on 23–24 January.

Wind Games 2016 was held on 21–23 January.

Wind Games 2017 was held on 3–4 February. Kyra Poh of Singapore won the solo speed competition and also won gold in solo freestyle. A video of the third-place solo freestyle performance by Maja Kuczyńska of Poland went viral.

The Wind Games is presented by world renowned AirSports presenter Regan Tetlow

References

Annual sporting events
Recurring sporting events established in 2014
2014 establishments in Spain